The Wild Horse Casino is located in the town of Dulce, New Mexico, at the junction of Highway 64 and Hawks Drive. The casino is operated by the Apache Nugget Corporation (ANC) which oversees all gaming activity for the Jicarilla Apache Nation. ANC is a for-profit Federally Chartered Section 17 Corporation owned by the Jicarilla Apache Nation. It is located in Dulce, New Mexico, the headquarters for the Nation. ANC has been in existence since 2003.

History 
The Wild Horse Casino re-opened on February 5, 2007, after a complete renovation and expansion.

The casino remains one of the main economic drivers of the area, which closes at night. It closed in March 2020 for a time in response to coronavirus.

Features and facilities 
The Wild Horse Casino has approximately 184 slot machines, 1 Roulette Table, 2 Blackjack Tables, and a Poker Room. In addition, it offers a restaurant, gift/smoke shop, and a player's club.

It has a 41-room hotel.

See also 
List of casinos in New Mexico

References

External links 
https://wildhorsecasinoandhotel.com

Native American casinos
Casinos in New Mexico
Buildings and structures in Rio Arriba County, New Mexico
Tourist attractions in Rio Arriba County, New Mexico
Jicarilla Apache
Native American history of New Mexico
Casino hotels